Dovas Zaunius (1845–1921) was a Prussian Lithuanian cultural and political activist.

Zaunius received only primary education and earned a living off his  farm in An Rokaiten. He supported publication of Lithuanian books and their smuggling across the Prussian–Russian border. Lithuanian-language books printed in the Latin alphabet were banned in Lithuania which was then part of the Russian Empire (see Lithuanian press ban). His farm welcomed various Lithuanian activists who were persecuted by the Tsarist authorities for violations of the ban or other political activities. Linguist Georg Sauerwein lived on the farm for a year and composed the poem Lietuvininkai we are born.

Between 1887 and 1903, Zaunius was elected as chairman of the Birutė Society several times. However, his tenure marked periods of low activity and the society came close to being liquidated in 1903. In 1900, Zaunius and his daughter Morta were entrusted with managing the budget for the Lithuanian exposition at the world's fair in Paris. He also managed the budget of the Lithuanian newspaper Varpas from 1900 to 1905. Zaunius also organized a library at his farm. It sought to collect all Lithuanian publications. Some of this collection was donated to the Lithuanian Scientific Society in Vilnius, the rest was lost during World War II.

In 1890, together with Martynas Jankus, Jonas Smalakys, and others, Zaunius established the first of the Lithuanian Conservative Election Societies. The goal of such societies was to elect Prussian Lithuanians to the German Reichstag and Prussian Landtag. When the society broke up based on the electoral districts, Zaunius chaired the Tilsit–Elchniederung section. He unsuccessfully ran in the Reichstag elections three times. In 1892 and 1900, he was involved with the collection of signatures for petitions to the Prussian Ministers of Education asking to leave the Lithuanian language in primary schools.

Family
Zaunius had nine children (three sons, six daughters), all of them received a good education and some of them became prominent figures:
 Youngest son Dovas Zaunius (1892–1940) was a diplomat and Lithuanian Minister of Foreign Affairs (1929–1934)
 Daughter Augustė Zauniūtė (1890–1950) was one of the first women medical doctors and had a practice in Memel (Klaipėda)
 Daughter Morta Zauniūtė (1875–1945) dedicated her life to the Lithuanian press, and helped Lithuanian book smugglers

Notes

References

1845 births
1921 deaths
Lithuania Minor
People from East Prussia